Piazza Dante (also known as Piazza delle Catene) is the main public square in Grosseto, Tuscany, Italy.

The piazza is located in the city's historic centre, included within the perimeter of the 16th-century city walls. It is home to the city's main representative buildings, including the St. Lawrence Cathedral, the Palazzo Comunale (City Hall) and the Palazzo Aldobrandeschi, seat of the Province of Grosseto. The northern section of the square is called Piazza Duomo, since it is overlooked by the cathedral's façade.

History

The main square of the city of Grosseto is documented as Platea Communis starting from 1222.

Buildings and monuments

Grosseto Cathedral

Palazzo Aldobrandeschi

Palazzo Comunale
The  is located on the northern side of Piazza Duomo and houses the City Council and the Mayor of Grosseto. The city hall was designed in 1867 by engineer Giovanni Clive, and built in a Neo-Renaissance style between 1870 and 1873. Its construction required the demolition of the 16th-century church of San Giovanni Decollato (St. John the Baptist) which stood here.

Palazzo Alben
Palazzo Alben is located on the western side of Piazza Duomo, opposite the cathedral. The palace was built between 1948 and 1950 by the enterprise ALBEN, on the site of the medieval , which was demolished in 1938 by the Fascist city government in order to build the new headquarters of the National Institute for Social Security. It is home to the Banca Nazionale del Lavoro.

Canapone
The statue of Leopold II of Tuscany, better known as Canapone, is a white marble monument located at the centre of the square. It was sculpted by artist , and positioned in 1846. It represents Leopold II, Grand Duke of Tuscany dressed as an ancient Roman, in the act of holding up with his left hand a woman, who bears a dead child, and with his right arm a smiling boy; the grand duke's right foot crushes the head of a snake, which is also devoured by a griffin. The allegorical sculpture was meant to celebrate the land reforms and reclamations perpetrated by the grand duke, who is depicted here as a Roman sage and saviour who comes to succour the Maremma (the woman) who has suffered for generations (the dead child); the next generation (the smiling boy) will be grateful to the grand duke who defeated the malaria (the snake), also thanks to the strength and sacrifice of the people of Grosseto (the griffin).

Colonna dei Bandi
The Colonna dei Bandi is an ancient Roman column located in the northern side of the square, on the right of the cathedral. Its presence in the piazza is attested to 1617, and confirmed in later records until 1832, and was used as the public spot to post municipal notices (bandi). The original column was removed in 1846 with the square's renovation and went lost. The current monument – a 2nd century AD column found in Rusellae in 1863 – was placed on the same site in 1966, during the celebration of the bicentenary of the establishment of the Province of Grosseto.

References

Bibliography

External links

Piazzas in Tuscany
Buildings and structures in Grosseto
Tourist attractions in Tuscany